James Warhola (born March 16, 1955) is an American artist who has illustrated more than two dozen children's picture books since 1987.

Early life
A native of Smock, a coal-mining region in Fayette County, Pennsylvania, near Pittsburgh, and of Lemko origin, he is the son of Paul Warhola, Andy Warhol's oldest brother. Warhola received a BFA degree in design from Carnegie Mellon University in 1977. From 1977 to 1980 he studied at the Art Students League of New York with Jack Faragasso, then privately with Michael Aviano.

Career
Warhola briefly worked for Andy Warhol at Interview magazine but left that job to become a science fiction illustrator, at which his uncle expressed his disgust in his diary.

As a science fiction illustrator in the early 1980s, Warhola did cover art for more than 300 books. Warhola is also one of Mad'''s "Usual Gang of Idiots," illustrating articles and covers for Mad.

Warhola has been a fantasy gamer and has done cover art for role-playing games and magazines like Different Worlds.

He wrote and illustrated Uncle Andy's: A Faabbbulous Visit with Andy Warhol (Putnam, 2003) about his uncle. The book garnered much attention with a feature article in The New York Times and interviews on television and NPR. The publisher offered this description:Horn Book commented, "In his debut as a writer, James Warhola uses a conversational style and childlike precision to describe one particular visit in 1962, when Warhol had recently made the transition from illustrator to fine artist. The watercolor illustrations are full of details." Uncle Andy's was also reviewed by Marianne Saccardi in School Library Journal:

In 2009 a spin-off book titled Uncle Andy's Cats'' was published. This told the story of how Andy Warhol's two cats had twenty five kittens and how he resolved the situation when he realized he had too many cats.

Warhola has worked for several major publishing houses, among them Warner Books and Prentice Hall. He serves as a consultant to the Andy Warhol Museum of Modern Art in Medzilaborce, Slovakia, near the Warhola ancestral village of Miková.

Personal life
Warhola, his wife Mary Carroll, and their daughter, Oonagh Warhola, live in Tivoli, New York.

References

External links

Complete list of Warhola's work for Mad
NPR: James Warhola (May 20, 2003)
 
 Interview with Radio Prague on 1-1-2015

1955 births
Living people
American speculative fiction artists
American children's book illustrators
Mad (magazine) cartoonists
Science fiction artists
American people of Lemko descent
Artists from Pittsburgh
Warhola family